TRF (an abbreviation of Tetsuya Komuro Rave Factory) is a Japanese pop band. Its members are DJ Koo, Sam, Etsu, Yu-ki and Chiharu.

History
The band debuted as "trf" in the year 1993. During the period of 1994 to 1995, the band released 5 singles produced by Tetsuya Komuro, each selling over a million copies under the Avex record label. In 1995, their song "Overnight Sensation: Jidai wa Anata ni Yudaneteru" received a Japan Record Award.

The following year, the band changed their name to an all-capital "TRF" with their single "Hey! Ladies & Gentlemen".

Yu-ki has also done voice acting for a children's animation movie Elmer's Adventure: My Father's Dragon, for which she sang the opening theme song as well. She has also performed the opening song to the 2006 Tokusatsu series Kamen Rider Kabuto as well as several variants to it.

Chiharu has worked on the choreography for J-Pop singer Shizuka Kudō, and has appeared in a drama as herself.

Sam was married to popstar and protégé of Tetsuya Komuro, Namie Amuro, in 1997, who was three months pregnant with his child at the time, but the couple were divorced in 2002, due to irreconcilable differences. Amuro had full custody of their son, Haruto Maruyama.

The song "Lights and Any More" has been used as opening theme of the anime Wangan Midnight, and their song Silence Whispers has been used as the second ending theme for the anime Black Jack 21. A remix of their song, Boy Meets Girl, was used in 2000 as the first season ending theme of the anime, UFO Baby, and in 2013 was covered by the group Prizmmy as the opening theme for the series Pretty Rhythm: Rainbow Live.

TRF's 20th anniversary was in February 2013. They announced that they'd be releasing something new every month, starting from November 2012.

Discography

Albums
 trf "This is the Truth" (25 February 1993)
 Hyper Techno Mix (21 May 1993)
 EZ Do Dance / trf (21 July 1993)
 Hyper Techno Mix II (21 October 1993)
 World Groove (9 February 1994)
 trf Hyper Mix III (27 April 1994)
 Billionaire (27 July 1994)
 Dance to Positive (27 March 1995)
 Hyper Mix 4 (21 June 1995)
 Brand New Tomorrow (11 December 1995)
 The Live (21 February 1996)
 Works -The Best of TRF- (1 January 1998)
 Unite (20 May 1998)
 Loop # 1999 (19 May 1999)
 Burst Drive Mix -Album- (27 December 2000)
 Lif-e-Motions (15 February 2006)
 TRF 15th Anniversary Best Memories (7 February 2007)
 Gravity (11 February 2009)
 Watch The Music (25 February 2013)

Singles
 "Going 2 Dance, Open Your Mind Siraju" (25 February 1993)
 "Open Your Mind" (12", U.S. release only, Radikal Records, 1993) known as 'TRF Rave Factory'
 "EZ Do Dance" (21 June 1993)
 "Ai ga Mou Sukoshi Hoshii Yo" (21 November 1993)
 "Silver and Gold dance" (21 November 1993)
 "Samui Yoru Dakara..." (16 December 1993)
 "Survival Dance 'No No Cry More'" (25 May 1994)
 "Boy Meets Girl" (22 June 1994)
 "Crazy Gonna Crazy" (1 January 1995)
 "Masquerade / Winter Grooves" (1 February 1995)
 "Overnight Sensation" (8 March 1995)
 "Brand New Tomorrow" (25 October 1995)
 "Happening Here / Teens" (11 December 1995)
 "Love & Peace Forever" (21 March 1996)
 "Hey! Ladies & Gentlemen" (12 June 1996)
 "Brave Story" (24 July 1996)
 "Silent Night" (6 November 1996)
 "Legend of Wind" (11 December 1996)
 "Dragons' Dance" (25 June 1997)
 "Unite! The Night!" (18 February 1998)
 "Frame" (25 March 1998)
 "Try or Cry" (29 April 1998)
 "Be Free" (23 September 1998)
 "Embrace / Slug and Soul" (5 November 1998)
 "Joy" (3 February 1999)
 "Wired" (21 April 1999)
 "He Lives in You" (25 August 1999)
 "Burst Drive Mix" (23 March 2000)
 "Burst Drive Mix -2nd Mix-" (31 May 2000)
 "Burst Drive Mix -3rd Mix-" (26 July 2000)
 "Da! Da! Da!" (SEB presents Boy Meets Girl with TRF) (23 August 2000)
 "Burst Drive Mix -4th Mix-" (20 September 2000)
 "Burst Drive mix -5th Mix-" (22 November 2000)
 "Where to Begin" (18 January 2006) - Oricon No. 18
 "Silence Whispers" (30 August 2006)
 "We Are All Bloomin" (29 November 2006)
 "Innovation" (17 October 2007)
 "Live Your Days" (23 April 2008)
 "Memorial Snow/Closure" (21 January 2009)

Compilation appearances
 Luna Sea Memorial Cover Album (19 December 2007)

DVD
 TRF Tour 1999 (29 March 2000)
 World Groove (29 March 2000)
 trf Tour '94 Billionaire - Boy Meets Girls (29 March 2000)
 Ultimate Films 1994-1995 (29 March 2000)
 trf Tour '95 Dance to Positive Overnight Sensation (29 March 2000)
 Brand New Tomorrow in Tokyo Dome -Presentation for 1996- (29 March 2000)
 TRF Live in Yokohama Arena (29 March 2000)
 TRF Tour '98 Live in Unite! (29 March 2000)
 Video Clips (11 December 2002)
 Works -The Best of TRF- (28 January 2004) - audio DVD
 Complete Best Live from 15th Anniversary Tour -Memories- 2007 (23 April 2008)

Video
 World Groove (26 September 1994)
 trf Tour '94 Billionaire - Boy Meets Girls (16 December 1994)
 Ultimate Films 1994-1995 (21 June 1995)
 trf Tour '95 Dance to Positive Overnight Sensation (22 November 1995)
 Brand New Tomorrow in Tokyo Dome -Presentation for 1996- (21 February 1996)
 TRF Live in Yokohama Arena (30 April 1997)
 TRF Tour '98 Live in Unite! (17 September 1998)
 Rave 2001 Dancer Selection Vol. 1 (30 June 1999)
 TRF Tour 1999 (15 December 1999)

See also
 List of best-selling music artists in Japan

References

External links
 Official website of TRF at Avex's website (in Japanese)
 Official website of YU-KI at Avex's website (in Japanese)
 Special J!-ENT 15th Anniversary Interview and Tribute to TRF (in English)

Avex Trax artists
Tetsuya Komuro
Japanese pop music groups
Japanese dance music groups
Japanese techno music groups